2009 in Russian football.

Club competitions

FC Rubin Kazan won the league for the second time in a row.

For more details, see:
2009 Russian Premier League
2009 Russian First Division
2009 Russian Second Division

Cup competitions

2008–09 Russian Cup

2009–10 Russian Cup

2009 Russian Super Cup

European club competitions

2008–09 UEFA Champions League

FC Zenit Saint Petersburg took third place in the group stage and enters the UEFA Cup at the round of 32.

2008–09 UEFA Cup

FC Zenit Saint Petersburg and CSKA Moscow was knocked out in the Round of 16.
 February 18, 2009 / Round of 32, First Leg / FC Zenit Saint Petersburg - Stuttgart 2-1 (Huszti  Tymoshchuk  - Gómez  ) / Saint Petersburg, Petrovsky Stadium / Attendance: 17,585
FC Zenit Saint Petersburg: Malafeev, Anyukov, Shirokov, Križanac, Šírl, Tymoshchuk (captain), Zyryanov (Tekke, 75), Semshov, Huszti (Fayzulin, 88), Danny, Pogrebnyak.
 February 18, 2009 / Round of 32, First Leg / Aston Villa - PFC CSKA Moscow 1-1 (Carew  - Vágner Love  ) / Birmingham, Villa Park / Attendance: 38,038
PFC CSKA Moscow: Akinfeev (captain), V. Berezutski, Ignashevich, A. Berezutskiy, Schennikov, Krasić, Rahimić, Aldonin (Mamaev, 90), Zhirkov (Caner, 90+2), Dzagoev (Carvalho, 80), Vágner Love.
 February 26, 2009 / Round of 32, Second Leg / PFC CSKA Moscow - Aston Villa  2-0 (Zhirkov  Vágner Love  ) / Moscow, Luzhniki Stadium / Attendance: 25,650
PFC CSKA Moscow: Akinfeev (captain), V. Berezutski, Ignashevich, A. Berezutskiy, Schennikov, Krasić, Rahimić, Šemberas, Zhirkov, Dzagoev, Vágner Love.
 February 26, 2009 / Round of 32, Second Leg / Stuttgart - FC Zenit Saint Petersburg   1-2 (Gebhart  - Semshov   Fayzulin  )/ Stuttgart, Mercedes-Benz Arena / Attendance: 34,500
FC Zenit Saint Petersburg: Malafeev, Kim, Križanac, Shirokov, Anyukov, Zyryanov, 	Denisov,  Semshov, Danny, Pogrebnyak, Huszti (Fayzulin, 73).
 March 12, 2009 / Round of 16, First Leg / PFC CSKA Moscow - Shakhtar Donetsk  1-0 (Vágner Love  ) / Moscow, Luzhniki Stadium / Attendance: 19,700
PFC CSKA Moscow: Akinfeev (captain), V. Berezutski, Ignashevich, A. Berezutskiy, Schennikov, Krasić (Kalouda, 89), Rahimić (Mamaev, 45), Šemberas, Zhirkov (Caner, 70), Dzagoev, Vágner Love.
 March 12, 2009 / Round of 16, First Leg / Udinese - FC Zenit Saint Petersburg   2-0 (Quagliarella Di Natale ) / Udine, Stadio Friuli / Attendance: 20,000
FC Zenit Saint Petersburg: Malafeev, Šírl, Križanac, Shirokov, Anyukov, Zyryanov (Fayzulin, 85), 	Denisov,  Tymoshchuk (captain), Danny, Pogrebnyak (Tekke, 62), Huszti (Semshov, 62).
 March 19, 2009 / Round of 16, Second Leg / FC Zenit Saint Petersburg - Udinese    1-0 (Tymoshchuk )/ Saint Petersburg, Petrovsky Stadium / Attendance: 19,500
FC Zenit Saint Petersburg: Malafeev, Šírl (Huszti, 71), Križanac, Fayzulin (Tekke, 71), Kim, Zyryanov, Denisov,  Tymoshchuk (captain), Danny, Pogrebnyak, Semshov.
 March 19, 2009 / Round of 16, Second Leg / Shakhtar Donetsk - PFC CSKA Moscow    2-0 (Fernandinho   Luiz Adriano ) / Donetsk, RSC Olimpiyskiy / Attendance: 25,000
PFC CSKA Moscow: Akinfeev (captain), V. Berezutski, Ignashevich, A. Berezutskiy, Schennikov, Krasić, Mamaev (Ryzhov, 76), Šemberas, Caner (Carvalho, 66), Dzagoev (Aldonin, 65), Vágner Love.

2009–10 UEFA Champions League

FC Dynamo Moscow lose in the Third qualifying round and enter into the play-off round of the 2009–10 UEFA Europa League.
 July 29, 2009 / Third qualifying round, First Leg /Celtic - FC Dynamo Moscow 0-1 (Kokorin  ) / Glasgow, Celtic Park / Attendance: 54,184
FC Dynamo Moscow: Gabulov, Kowalczyk, Fernández, K. Kombarov, D. Kombarov, Kerzhakov, Granat, Wilkshire, Kolodin, Svezhov, Kokorin (Smolov, 74).
 August 5, 2009 / Third qualifying round, Second Leg / FC Dynamo Moscow - Celtic   0-2 (McDonald   Samaras ) / Khimki, Arena Khimki / Attendance: 13,753
FC Dynamo Moscow: Gabulov, Kowalczyk, Fernández (Ropotan, 90+6), K. Kombarov, Khokhlov, D. Kombarov, Kerzhakov, Granat, Wilkshire, Kolodin, Svezhov (Kokorin, 84).

FC Rubin Kazan and PFC CSKA Moscow qualified directly into group stage. FC Rubin Kazan finished third  in Group F and enters in UEFA Europa League knockout stage. PFC CSKA Moscow finished second  in Group B and enters in First knockout round.
 September 15, 2009 / Matchday 1 / Wolfsburg - PFC CSKA Moscow    3-1 (Grafite   - Dzagoev ) / Wolfsburg, Volkswagen Arena / Attendance: 25,017
PFC CSKA Moscow: Akinfeev (captain), Šemberas, Ignashevich, A. Berezutskiy, Dzagoev, Krasić, Guilherme, Aldonin (Mamaev, 68), V. Berezutski (Necid, 84), Rahimić,   Schennikov (Piliyev, 57).
 September 16, 2009 / Matchday 1 / Dynamo Kyiv - FC Rubin Kazan    3-1 (Yussuf   Magrão   Husyev   - Domínguez ) / Kyiv, Lobanovsky Dynamo Stadium / Attendance: 15,000
FC Rubin Kazan: Ryzhikov, Ansaldi, César Navas, Semak (captain), Domínguez (Murawski, 77), Bukharov, Ryazantsev (Kasaev, 83), Noboa, Kaleshin, Gökdeniz, Sharonov.
 September 29, 2009 / Matchday 2 / FC Rubin Kazan -  Internazionale  1-1 (Domínguez   - Stanković ) / Kazan, Central Stadium / Attendance: 23,670
FC Rubin Kazan: Ryzhikov, Ansaldi, César Navas, Semak (captain), Salukvadze, Domínguez (Kasaev, 86), Bukharov, Ryazantsev, Noboa, Gökdeniz, Sharonov.
 September 30, 2009 / Matchday 2 / PFC CSKA Moscow -  Beşiktaş   2-1 (Dzagoev   Krasić   - Dağ ) / Moscow, Luzhniki Stadium / Attendance: 19,750
PFC CSKA Moscow: Akinfeev (captain), Šemberas, Ignashevich, A. Berezutskiy (Grigoryev, 46), Dzagoev, Mamaev, González (Schennikov, 78), Odiah,  Krasić, V. Berezutski, Necid (Rahimić, 64).
 October 20, 2009 / Matchday 3 / Barcelona - FC Rubin Kazan    1-2 (Ibrahimović   - Ryazantsev  Gökdeniz ) / Barcelona, Camp Nou / Attendance: 55,930
FC Rubin Kazan: Ryzhikov, Ansaldi, César Navas, Semak (captain) (Murawski, 43), Salukvadze, Domínguez, Ryazantsev (Kasaev, 83), Noboa, Kaleshin, Gökdeniz (Popov, 90+3), Sharonov.
 October 21, 2009 / Matchday 3 / PFC CSKA Moscow -  Manchester United   0-1 (Valencia ) / Moscow, Luzhniki Stadium / Attendance: 51,250
PFC CSKA Moscow: Akinfeev (captain), Šemberas, Ignashevich, A. Berezutskiy, Dzagoev,  Odiah,  Krasić, V. Berezutski, Rahimić (Carvalho, 90), Schennikov (Mamaev, 62), Necid (Piliyev, 73).
 November 3, 2009 / Matchday 4 / Manchester United - PFC CSKA Moscow  3-3 (Owen  Scholes  Valencia  - Dzagoev  Krasić  V. Berezutski  ) / Manchester, Old Trafford / Attendance: 73,718
PFC CSKA Moscow: Akinfeev (captain), Šemberas, Ignashevich, A. Berezutskiy, Dzagoev (Carvalho, 72),  Mamaev (Rahimić, 70),  Krasić, Aldonin, V. Berezutski,  Schennikov, Necid (Piliyev, 85).
 November 4, 2009 / Matchday 4 / FC Rubin Kazan - Barcelona  0-0 / Kazan, Central Stadium / Attendance: 24,600
FC Rubin Kazan: Ryzhikov, Ansaldi, César Navas, Semak (captain), Salukvadze, Domínguez, Ryazantsev, Noboa, Kaleshin, Gökdeniz (Bukharov, 62), Sharonov.
 November 24, 2009 / Matchday 5 / FC Rubin Kazan - Dynamo Kyiv  0-0 / Kazan, Central Stadium / Attendance: 23,185
FC Rubin Kazan: Ryzhikov, Ansaldi, César Navas, Semak (captain), Salukvadze, Domínguez, Bukharov, Ryazantsev, Noboa, Gökdeniz (Bystrov, 75), Sharonov (Kaleshin, 53).
 November 25, 2009 / Matchday 5 / PFC CSKA Moscow -  Wolfsburg   2-1 (Necid   Krasić   - Džeko ) / Moscow, Luzhniki Stadium / Attendance: 13,478
PFC CSKA Moscow: Akinfeev (captain), Ignashevich, A. Berezutskiy, Dzagoev, Mamaev, Krasić, Aldonin, V. Berezutski, Rahimić, Schennikov, Necid.
 December 8, 2009 / Matchday 6 / Beşiktaş - PFC CSKA Moscow  1-2 (Bobô   -  Krasić  Aldonin  ) / Istanbul, BJK İnönü Stadium / Attendance: 16,129
PFC CSKA Moscow: Akinfeev (captain), Šemberas, Dzagoev (Grigoryev, 90+6),  Mamaev, Odiah, Krasić (Oliseh, 82), Aldonin, V. Berezutski,  Rahimić, Schennikov, Necid.
 December 9, 2009 / Matchday 6 / Internazionale - FC Rubin Kazan  2-0 (Eto'o   Balotelli ) / Milan, San Siro / Attendance: 49,539
FC Rubin Kazan: Ryzhikov, César Navas, Semak (captain), Salukvadze, Domínguez, Ryazantsev (Balyaikin, 84), Noboa (Bystrov, 81), Kaleshin, Popov, Murawski, Gökdeniz (Kasaev, 74).

2009–10 UEFA Europa League
FC Krylia Sovetov Samara lose in the Third qualifying round.
 July 30, 2009 / Third qualifying round, First Leg / St Patrick's Athletic - FC Krylia Sovetov Samara  1-0 (O'Brien  ) / Dublin, Richmond Park / Attendance: 3,500
FC Krylia Sovetov Samara: Lobos, Kalachev, Leilton, Shishkin, Bober, Savin, Jarošík, Adzhindzhal, Ignatyev, Belozyorov, Ivanov (Kulik, 78).
 August 6, 2009 / Third qualifying round, Second Leg / FC Krylia Sovetov Samara - St Patrick's Athletic 3-2 (Bober   Savin  - Bober  O'Brien  ) / Samara, Metallurg Stadium / Attendance: 17,000
FC Krylia Sovetov Samara: Lobos, Kalachev, Shishkin, Bober, Taranov, Savin, Adzhindzhal, Ignatyev (Kulik, 39), Budylin (Leilton, 68), Belozyorov, Ivanov.

FC Amkar Perm, FC Zenit Saint Petersburg and FC Dynamo Moscow lose in the Play-off round.

 August 20, 2009 / Play-off round, First Leg / CSKA Sofia - FC Dynamo Moscow 0-0 / Sofia, Vasil Levski National Stadium / Attendance: 23,250
FC Dynamo Moscow: Gabulov, Kowalczyk, Fernández, K. Kombarov, Khokhlov (Ropotan, 85), D. Kombarov, Kerzhakov, Granat, Wilkshire, Kolodin, Kokorin (Aguiar, 68).
 August 20, 2009 / Play-off round, First Leg / Fulham - FC Amkar Perm 3-1 ( Johnson  Dempsey  Zamora  - Grishin ) / London, Craven Cottage / Attendance: 13,029
FC Amkar Perm: Narubin, Peev, Novaković (Telkiyski, 68), Sirakov, Gaál, Jean Carlos (Junuzović, 85), Drinčić, Zhilyayev (Grishin, 60), Belorukov, Cherenchikov, Kushev.
 August 20, 2009 / Play-off round, First Leg / Nacional - FC Zenit Saint Petersburg   4-3 (Luís Alberto  João Aurélio  Silva  Micael  - Semshov   Tekke  ) / Funchal, Estádio da Madeira / Attendance: 2,500
FC Zenit Saint Petersburg: Malafeev, Anyukov, Meira, Lombaerts, Hubočan, Shirokov, Zyryanov, Kornilenko (Tekke, 68), Semshov, Huszti (Rosina, 58), Denisov (Ignatovich, 76).
 August 27, 2009 / Play-off round, Second Leg / FC Amkar Perm - Fulham   1-0 ( Kushev ) / Perm, Zvezda Stadium / Attendance: 20,000
FC Amkar Perm: Narubin, Grishin (Junuzović, 76), Telkiyski (Novaković, 60), Peev, Sirakov, Gaál, Jean Carlos (Zhilyayev, 64), Drinčić, Belorukov, Cherenchikov, Kushev.
 August 27, 2009 / Play-off round, Second Leg / FC Dynamo Moscow - CSKA Sofia   1-2  (Kerzhakov  - Delev  Ivanov  / Khimki, Arena Khimki / Attendance: 8,486
FC Dynamo Moscow: Gabulov, Kowalczyk (Smolov, 61), Fernández, K. Kombarov, Khokhlov, D. Kombarov, Kerzhakov, Granat (Kokorin, 56), Aguiar (Dimidko, 46), Wilkshire, Kolodin.
 August 27, 2009 / Play-off round, Second Leg / FC Zenit Saint Petersburg - Nacional  1-1 (Tekke  ) - Micael ) / Saint Petersburg, Petrovsky Stadium / Attendance: 20,000
FC Zenit Saint Petersburg: Čontofalský, Anyukov, Meira, Kim, Lombaerts, Tekke (Rosina, 61), Shirokov (Križanac, 71), Zyryanov, Kornilenko, Semshov, Huszti (Ignatovich, 90+1).

 
Seasons in Russian football